Bandi Theke Begum is a Bangladeshi drama film, released in 1975. The film directed by Mohshin.  Story, screenplay and dialogue by journalist and also writer Ahmed Zaman Choudhury. The film stars Razzak and Bobita in a lead role with Shahed Sharif, Zafor Iqbal, Baby Zaman, Khalil supporting role. In the film, first time Bobita won National Film Award.

Cast
 Razzak - Ali Nowsher
 Shahed Sharif
 Babita - Chadni
 Maya Hazarika
 Jubair Alam
 Jarina
 Kanak
 Sulagna
 Khan Zainul
 Shayla Zaman
 Khalil
 Safadar Ali Bhuiyan
 Baby Zaman
 Zafar Iqbal

Music
The film music directed by Azad Rahman. Ahmad Zaman Chowdhury penned the lyrics. The film singer are Sabina Yasmin, Nazmul Huda Bachchu and Anjuman Ara Begum.

Track list

Award
National Film Award

 Won: Best Actress - Babita

References

External links
 

1975 films
Bengali-language Bangladeshi films
Bangladeshi drama films
1970s Bengali-language films
1975 drama films
Films scored by Azad Rahman